The 2014 Detroit Tigers season was the team's 114th season. This was the team's first year under a mostly new coaching staff led by rookie Manager Brad Ausmus. On September 28, the last day of the regular season, the Tigers clinched the American League Central title with a 3–0 win over the Minnesota Twins. The Tigers finished one game ahead of the Kansas City Royals, with a 90–72 record. It was their fourth consecutive American League Central title. They became the first AL Central team to win four consecutive titles since the Cleveland Indians won five straight from 1995 to 1999, and the first Tigers team to ever make four consecutive postseason appearances. Despite all of this, the Tigers' season ended on October 5 when they were swept by the Baltimore Orioles in the American League Division Series. This snapped Detroit's streak of three consecutive American League Championship Series appearances.

Roster moves

Coaching staff
On October 21, Jim Leyland stepped down from his managerial position after eight years with Detroit.  He later confirmed that he joined the Tigers front office as a special assistant to team president/GM/CEO Dave Dombrowski.
On November 3, the Tigers announced Brad Ausmus was named Leyland's successor, and signed to a three-year contract with a club option for 2017.
On November 3, the Tigers announced bench coach Gene Lamont will return in the same role for the 2014 season.
Hitting coach Lloyd McClendon did not return for 2014, as he was named the new manager of the Seattle Mariners on November 5. The Mariners later hired former Tigers bullpen coach Mike Rojas.
On November 6, the Tigers announced Jeff Jones would return as pitching coach. They also announced the hiring of Dave Clark as third-base coach and outfield instructor.
On November 17, the Tigers announced the hiring of Wally Joyner as hitting coach, Mick Billmeyer as bullpen coach, and Matt Martin was named to the newly created post of defensive coordinator.
On November 18, the Tigers announced the hiring of Omar Vizquel as the first-base, infield and baserunning coach.
On November 25, the Tigers announced the hiring of Darnell Coles as assistant hitting coach, rounding out their 2014 coaching staff.

Signings
On November 21, the Tigers avoided arbitration with relief pitcher Phil Coke with a one-year contract.
On December 2, the Tigers avoided arbitration with utility player Don Kelly with a one-year contract.
On December 4, the Tigers signed closer Joe Nathan to a two-year, $20 million contract, with a club option for 2016.
On December 11, the Tigers signed outfielder Rajai Davis to a two-year, $10 million contract.
On December 13, the Tigers signed pitcher Joba Chamberlain to a one-year contract worth $2.5 million plus incentives.
On January 8, the Tigers re-signed shortstop José Iglesias to a one-year, $1.65 million contract.
On January 17, the Tigers avoided arbitration when they reached one-year deals with pitchers Al Alburquerque, Rick Porcello and Max Scherzer, and outfielders Andy Dirks and Austin Jackson. Scherzer, the reigning AL Cy Young winner, received a $15.525 million salary for 2014.
On January 31, the Tigers avoided arbitration with catcher Alex Avila, agreeing on a one-year contract worth $4.15 million with a club option for 2015.
On February 24, the Tigers reached one-year deals with third baseman Nick Castellanos, outfielder Steven Moya, and pitchers Drew Smyly, Kyle Lobstein, José Ortega, Luke Putkonen and Evan Reed.
On March 1, the Tigers rounded out their 40-man roster by signing one-year deals with pitchers José Álvarez, Ian Krol, Melvin Mercedes, and Bruce Rondón; catcher Bryan Holaday, second basemen Steve Lombardozzi Jr. and Hernán Pérez, and third baseman Francisco Martínez.
On March 24, the Tigers signed outfielder J. D. Martinez to a minor league contract.
On March 28, the Tigers signed Miguel Cabrera to an eight-year, $248 million contract extension. Combined with the $44 million the Tigers owed on the remaining two years of Cabrera's current contract, the total ten-year commitment is worth $292 million, and will keep Cabrera under contract until at least 2023.
On March 29, the Tigers purchased the contract of outfielder Tyler Collins from AA Erie.
On May 2, the Tigers signed relief pitcher Joel Hanrahan to a one-year, $1 million contract, plus incentives.
On August 5, the Tigers signed relief pitcher Jim Johnson to a minor-league contract.

Releases
On October 30, the Tigers announced they will not re-sign backup catcher Brayan Peña. 
On November 1, the Tigers announced they had declined the option on relief pitcher José Veras' contract, making him a free agent.
On November 1, the Tigers announced relief pitcher Darin Downs left the Tigers and was claimed off waivers by the Houston Astros, and utility player Matt Tuiasosopo left and was claimed off waivers by the Arizona Diamondbacks.
On November 24, free agent shortstop Jhonny Peralta left the Tigers and signed a four-year deal with the St. Louis Cardinals.
On December 4, the Tigers announced they will not re-sign free agent relief pitcher Joaquín Benoit and released him to free agency. 
On December 16, free agent second baseman Omar Infante left the Tigers and signed a four-year deal with the Kansas City Royals.
On January 30, free agent utility infielder Ramón Santiago left the Tigers after eight years and signed a minor league contract with the Cincinnati Reds.
On April 20, the Tigers released shortstop Álex González.

Trades
On November 20, the Tigers traded first baseman Prince Fielder to the Texas Rangers for second baseman Ian Kinsler and cash considerations.
On December 2, the Tigers traded starting pitcher Doug Fister to the Washington Nationals for second baseman Steve Lombardozzi Jr. and pitchers Ian Krol and Robbie Ray.
On March 21, the Tigers traded pitcher José Álvarez to the Los Angeles Angels of Anaheim for shortstop Andrew Romine.
On March 24, the Tigers traded second baseman Steve Lombardozzi Jr. to the Baltimore Orioles for shortstop Álex González.
On July 23, the Tigers traded pitchers Jake Thompson and Corey Knebel to the Texas Rangers for reliever Joakim Soria.
On July 31, the Tigers traded outfielder Austin Jackson to the Seattle Mariners, and pitcher Drew Smyly and shortstop Willy Adames to the Tampa Bay Rays in a three-team deal to acquire pitcher David Price.

Season highlights

Individual accomplishments

Pitching
On May 5, Max Scherzer became the first pitcher in franchise history to start a season with seven or more strikeouts in his first seven starts, and the first American League pitcher to do so since Mike Mussina in 2003.
On June 12, Max Scherzer ended a drought of 178 career starts without a complete game when he pitched a complete game shutout in a three-hit 4–0 win over the Chicago White Sox. This was the longest stretch any major league starter had gone without a complete game since 1900.
On July 1, Rick Porcello became the first Tiger to pitch back-to-back shutouts since Jack Morris in 1986. Following a 6–0 shutout win over the Texas Rangers on June 26, he shut out the Oakland Athletics 3–0 in his next start. In the latter game, Porcello became the first Major League pitcher to throw a shutout without a walk or a strikeout since Jeff Ballard on August 21, 1989, and the first Tiger pitcher to do so since Dizzy Trout in 1944.
On July 26, Drew Smyly became the first Detroit Tigers left-hander to strike out at least 11 batters in a game since David Wells on June 4, 1993.
On August 14, Max Scherzer recorded a season-high 14 strikeouts in a 5–2 victory over the Pittsburgh Pirates. Coincidentally, Max's career high of 15 strikeouts in a game also came at the expense of the Pirates, on May 20, 2012.
On August 20, Rick Porcello recorded his third complete game shutout of the season in a three-hit 6–0 win over the Tampa Bay Rays. Porcello ties Henderson Álvarez for the major league lead in shutouts. Porcello's three complete game shutouts are the most by a Tiger pitcher in a single season since Jeff Weaver threw three in 2002.
On August 21, David Price allowed one hit and one unearned run, in a complete game 1–0 loss against his former team, the Tampa Bay Rays. Price is the first pitcher in the major leagues to lose a complete game, one-hitter or better, with no earned runs since Andy Hawkins lost a no-hitter for the New York Yankees on July 1, 1990. It was the first time since 1914 that a pitcher has lost a complete game, one-hit, no walk start without allowing an earned run.
On August 24, Max Scherzer became the American League's first 15-game winner this season after the Tigers defeated the Minnesota Twins 13–4.
On September 28, in the AL Central division-clinching game, David Price struck out eight Minnesota Twins batters to overtake the Cleveland Indians' Corey Kluber for the most strikeouts in the major leagues. Price finished with 271 strikeouts to Kluber's 269.

Hitting
On May 13, Víctor Martínez became the second Detroit Tigers player to hit a home run completely out of Oriole Park at Camden Yards and onto Eutaw Street, following Mickey Tettleton in 1992.
On June 7, Nick Castellanos had his third consecutive three-hit game, making him the fifth rookie in Tigers history to do so, and the first since Ricky Peters in 1980.
On June 14, Eugenio Suárez fell a single shy of the cycle, hitting a solo home run, double, and triple, to help the Tigers defeat the Minnesota Twins, 12–9.
On June 30, Rajai Davis hit a walk-off grand slam to defeat the Oakland Athletics 5–4, the day the Tigers celebrated the 30th anniversary of the 1984 World Series winning team. It was the first walk-off grand slam by a Tiger since Carlos Peña on June 27, 2004, the day the Tigers celebrated the 20th anniversary of their 1984 title-winning team. The last Tigers walk-off grand slam before that was 10 years earlier, on June 21, 1994, by Lou Whitaker.
Austin Jackson finished the month of July with 15 multi-hit games, the second most in franchise history in the month of July, behind only Ron LeFlore with 16 in 1977.
On October 2, during Game 1 of the ALDS against the Baltimore Orioles, Ian Kinsler saw 37 pitches in four plate appearances, tying him with Bobby Abreu for fourth most in a postseason game since the statistic began being kept in 1988. Kinsler broke the record for most pitches seen in a playoff game in four or fewer plate appearances, previously held by Manny Ramirez, seeing 31 in Game 3 of the 2007 ALDS. Kinsler averaged 9.25 pitches per plate appearance, breaking the old mark of 7.75 that was also set by Ramirez in Game 3 of the 2007 ALDS.
On October 3, during Game 2 of the ALDS against the Baltimore Orioles, J. D. Martinez became the first player in Tigers history to homer in each of his first two career postseason games, the 16th player in Major League history, and the first overall since Arizona's Paul Goldschmidt in 2011.
Designated hitter Víctor Martínez won the American League's Silver Slugger Award at DH, with a .335 batting average (second in the AL to Houston's José Altuve), 32 home runs, .974 OPS (which led all of baseball), and his .409 on-base percentage (which led the AL). Martínez was also named a finalist for the American League Most Valuable Player award, finishing second to Mike Trout.

Defense
Ian Kinsler was awarded the Wilson Defensive Player of the Year Award as the best second baseman in the Major Leagues.

Team accomplishments
On August 2, the Tigers scored at least one run in every inning of the game in an 11–5 win over the Colorado Rockies. They became the first team to accomplish this feat since the New York Yankees did so against the Toronto Blue Jays on April 29, 2006, and the first Tigers team to do so since 1912.
On August 10, the Tigers were defeated by the Toronto Blue Jays 6–5 in a 19 inning game that took six hours and 37 minutes. It was the first 19 inning game for the Tigers since April 27, 1984. The game was the second longest Tigers game in duration since a 22-inning, seven-hour game on June 24, 1962. It tied for the fourth longest game innings-wise in franchise history.
On August 24, the Tigers tied the franchise record for the most hits in a four-game series with 60 hits against the Minnesota Twins. The last time the Tigers had 60 hits in a four-game series was against the Chicago White Sox in 1956.
The Tigers spent 162 calendar days atop of the American League Central, the most days in first place by any team in the majors during the 2014 season.
On October 2, during Game 1 of the ALDS against the Baltimore Orioles, Víctor Martínez and J. D. Martinez hit back-to-back home runs in the second inning. During Game 2 of the ALDS, J. D. Martinez and Nick Castellanos hit back-to-back home runs in the fourth inning. The Tigers became the fourth team in postseason history to hit back-to-back home runs in consecutive postseason games, following the Tampa Bay Rays during the 2008 ALCS, the Florida Marlins during the 2003 NLCS, and the New York Yankees during the 1995 ALDS. Detroit is the first team in history to open the postseason with back-to-back home runs in consecutive games.

All-Stars
The Tigers sent three players to the 2014 All-Star Game. First baseman Miguel Cabrera was voted in as the starter at first base in the fan voting, while designated hitter Víctor Martínez and pitcher Max Scherzer were selected as reserves in the player voting. Martínez did not participate in the All-Star game due to right side soreness, so his teammate, second baseman Ian Kinsler, took his place on the American League roster. The Tigers had a chance to send a fourth player to the All-Star Game this season, as pitcher Rick Porcello was one of the five finalists for the AL in the All-Star Final Vote, but he was beaten out by Chris Sale of the Chicago White Sox.

Scherzer became the winning pitcher of the game, the first Tiger to do so since Jim Bunning in 1957, while Cabrera became the first Tiger to hit a home run in the All Star Game since Lou Whitaker did so in 1986.

Standings

American League Central

Game log

Regular season

|- bgcolor="#bbffbb"
| 1 || March 31 || Royals || W 4–3 || Nathan (1–0) || Davis (0–1) || — || 45,068 || 1–0
|-  bgcolor=

|- bgcolor="#bbffbb"
| 2 || April 2 || Royals || W 2–1 (10) || Alburquerque (1–0) || Collins (0–1) || — || 26,906 || 2–0
|- bgcolor="bbbbbb" 
| — || April 3 || Royals  ||colspan=6| Postponed (rain). Rescheduled to June 19.
|- bgcolor="#bbffbb"
| 3 || April 4 || Orioles || W 10–4 || Smyly (1–0) || González (0–1) || — || 23,625 || 3–0
|- bgcolor="#bbffbb"
| 4 || April 5 || Orioles || W 7–6 || Porcello (1–0) || Norris (0–1) || Nathan (1) || 32,041 || 4–0
|- bgcolor="ffbbbb"
| 5 || April 6 || Orioles || L 1–3 || Tillman (1–0) || Verlander (0–1) || Hunter (1) || 34,261 || 4–1
|- bgcolor="ffbbbb"
| 6 || April 8 || @ Dodgers || L 2–3 (10) || Howell (1–0) || Chamberlain (0–1) || — || 53,231 || 4–2
|- bgcolor="#bbffbb"
| 7 || April 9 || @ Dodgers || W 7–6 (10) || Nathan (2–0) || Jansen (0–1) || Alburquerque (1) || 42,687 || 5–2
|- bgcolor="ffbbbb"
| 8 || April 11 || @ Padres || L 6–0 || Cashner (1–1) || Porcello (1–1) || — || 30,353 || 5–3
|- bgcolor="#bbffbb"
| 9 || April 12 || @ Padres || W 6–2 || Verlander (1–1) || Kennedy (1–2) || — || 42,182 || 6–3
|- bgcolor="ffbbbb"
| 10 || April 13 || @ Padres || L 5–1 || Ross (1–2) || Scherzer (0–1) || — || 32,267 || 6–4
|- bgcolor="bbbbbb" 
| — || April 15 || Indians || colspan=6| Postponed (inclement weather).  Rescheduled to July 19.
|- bgcolor="ffbbbb"
| 11 || April 16 || Indians || L 3–2 || McAllister (2–0) || Sánchez (0–1) || Axford (5) || 23,811 || 6–5
|- bgcolor="#bbffbb"
| 12 || April 17 || Indians || W 7–5 || Verlander (2–1) || Salazar (0–2) || Nathan (2) || 25,990 || 7–5
|- bgcolor="ffbbbb"
| 13 || April 18 || Angels || L 6–11 || Weaver (1–2) || Smyly (1–1) || — || 28,435|| 7–6
|- bgcolor="#bbffbb"
| 14 || April 19 || Angels || W 5–2 || Scherzer (1–1) || Wilson (2–2) || — || 36,659|| 8–6
|- bgcolor="#bbffbb"
| 15 || April 20 || Angels || W 2–1 || Porcello (2–1) || Santiago (0–3) || Nathan (3) ||28,921 || 9–6
|- bgcolor="ffbbbb"
| 16 || April 21 || White Sox || L 1–3 || Danks (2–0) || Sánchez (0–2) || Lindstrom (2) || 24,997 || 9–7
|- bgcolor="#bbffbb"
| 17 || April 22 || White Sox || W 8–6 || Verlander (3–1) || Leesman (0–1) || Chamberlain (1) || 24,976 || 10–7
|- bgcolor="ffbbbb"
| 18 || April 23 || White Sox || L 4–6 || Rienzo (1–0) || Reed (0–1) || Lindstrom (3) || 23,451 || 10–8
|- bgcolor="#bbffbb"
| 19 || April 24 || White Sox || W 7–4 || Scherzer (2–1) || Quintana (1–2) || Nathan (4) || 28,514 || 11–8
|- bgcolor="#bbffbb"
| 20 || April 25 || @ Twins || W 10–6 || Porcello (3–1) || Correia (0–3) || — || 27,558 || 12–8
|- bgcolor="ffbbbb"
| 21 || April 26 || @ Twins ||  L 3–5 || Hughes (2–1) || Ortega (0–1) || Perkins (6) || 28,122 || 12–9
|- bgcolor="bbbbbb" 
| — || April 27 || @ Twins || colspan=6| Postponed (rain). Rescheduled to August 23.
|- bgcolor="#bbffbb"
| 22 || April 29 || @ White Sox || W 4–3 || Chamberlain (1–1) || Belisario (1–3) || Nathan (5) || 17,023 || 13–9
|- bgcolor="#bbffbb"
| 23 || April 30 || @ White Sox || W 5–1 || Scherzer (3–1) || Noesí (0–2) || — || 15,157 || 14–9
|- bgcolor="

|- bgcolor="#bbffbb"
| 24 || May 2 || @ Royals || W 8–2 || Porcello (4–1) || Shields (3–3) || — || 28,021 || 15–9
|- bgcolor="#bbffbb"
| 25 || May 3 || @ Royals || W 9–2 || Smyly (2–1) || Duffy (1–2) || — || 29,200 || 16–9
|- bgcolor="#bbffbb"
| 26 || May 4 || @ Royals || W 9–4 || Verlander (4–1) || Vargas (2–1) || — || 22,504 || 17–9
|- bgcolor="#bbffbb"
| 27 || May 5 || Astros || W 2–0 || Scherzer (4–1) || Cosart (1–3) || Nathan (6) || 26,475 || 18–9
|- bgcolor="#bbffbb"
| 28 || May 6 || Astros || W 11–4 || Ray (1–0) || Oberholtzer (0–6) || — || 27,939 || 19–9
|- bgcolor="#bbffbb"
| 29 || May 7 || Astros || W 3–2 || Porcello (5–1) || Peacock (0–3) || Nathan (7) || 26,207 || 20–9
|- bgcolor="ffbbbb"
| 30 || May 8 || Astros || L 2–6 || Keuchel (3–2) || Smyly (2–2) || — || 35,643 || 20–10
|- bgcolor="ffbbbb"
| 31 || May 9 || Twins || L 1–2 || Hughes (4–1) || Verlander (4–2) || Perkins (9) || 35,814 || 20–11
|- bgcolor="#bbffbb"
| 32 || May 10 || Twins || W 9–3 || Scherzer (5–1) || Gibson (3–3) || — || 42,312 || 21–11
|- bgcolor="ffbbbb"
| 33 || May 11 || Twins || L 3–4 || Burton (1–1) || Chamberlain (1–2) || Perkins (10) || 40,468 || 21–12
|- bgcolor="#bbffbb"
| 34 || May 12 || @ Orioles || W 4–1 || Porcello (6–1) || Norris (2–3) || Nathan (8) || 24,517 || 22–12
|- bgcolor="#bbffbb"
| 35 || May 13 || @ Orioles || W 4–1 || Miller (1–0) || Hunter (1–1) || Nathan (9) || 29,950 || 23–12
|- bgcolor="#bbffbb"
| 36 || May 14 || @ Orioles || W 7–5 || Verlander (5–2) || Gausman (0–1) || Nathan (10) || 36,727 || 24–12
|- bgcolor="#bbffbb"
| 37 || May 16 ||@  Red Sox || W 1–0 || Scherzer (6–1) || Lester (4–5) || Nathan (11) || 37,225 || 25–12
|- bgcolor="#bbffbb"
| 38 || May 17 || @ Red Sox || W 6–1 || Porcello (7–1) || Lackey (5–3) || — || 37,608 || 26–12
|- bgcolor="#bbffbb"
| 39 || May 18 || @ Red Sox || W 6–2 || Sánchez (1–2) || Peavy (1–2) || — || 35,006 || 27–12
|- bgcolor="ffbbbb"
| 40 || May 19 || @ Indians || L 4–5 (10) || Atchison (1–0) || Alburquerque (1–1) || — || 12,709 || 27–13
|- bgcolor="ffbbbb"
| 41 || May 20 || @ Indians || L 2–6 || Bauer (1–1) || Verlander (5–3) || — || 13,924 || 27–14
|- bgcolor="ffbbbb"
| 42 || May 21 || @ Indians || L 10–11 (13) || Tomlin (3–1) || Coke (0–1) || — || 19,228 || 27–15
|- bgcolor="ffbbbb"
| 43 || May 22 || Rangers || L 2–9 || Darvish (4–2) || Ray (1–1) || — || 40,768 || 27–16
|- bgcolor="#bbffbb"
| 44 || May 23 || Rangers || W 7–2 || Sánchez (2–2) || Baker (0–1) || — || 39,835 || 28–16
|- bgcolor="ffbbbb"
| 45 || May 24 || Rangers || L 2–12 || Martinez (1–1) || Porcello (7–2) || — || 43,447 || 28–17
|- bgcolor="ffbbbb"
| 46 || May 25 || Rangers || L 4–12 || Lewis (4–3) || Verlander (5–4) || — || 42,583 || 28–18
|- bgcolor="ffbbbb"
| 47 || May 26 || @ Athletics || L 0–10 || Milone (3–3) || Smyly (2–3) || — || 35,067 || 28–19
|- bgcolor="#bbffbb"
| 48 || May 27 || @ Athletics || W 6–5 || Alburquerque (2–1) || Abad (0–2) || Nathan (12) || 21,549 || 29–19
|- bgcolor="ffbbbb"
| 49 || May 28 || @ Athletics || L 1–3 || Kazmir (6–2) || Nathan (2–1) || — || 15,590 || 29–20
|- bgcolor="#bbffbb"
| 50 || May 29 || @ Athletics || W 5–4 || Porcello (8–2) || Chavez (4–3) || Nathan (13) || 21,860 || 30–20
|- bgcolor="#bbffbb"
| 51 || May 30 || @ Mariners || W 6–3 || Verlander (6–4) || Iwakuma (3–2) || Chamberlain (2) || 29,000 || 31–20
|- bgcolor="ffbbbb"
| 52 || May 31 || @ Mariners || L 2–3 || Young (5–2) || Smyly (2–4) || Rodney (14) || 37,142 || 31–21
|-

|- bgcolor="ffbbbb"
| 53 || June 1 || @ Mariners || L 0–4 || Elías (4–4) || Scherzer (6–2) || — || 31,407 || 31–22
|- bgcolor="ffbbbb"
| 54 || June 3 || Blue Jays || L 3–5 || McGowan (3–2) || Nathan (2–2) || Janssen (9) || 33,488 || 31–23
|- bgcolor="ffbbbb"
| 55 || June 4 || Blue Jays ||  L 2–8 || Dickey (6–4) || Porcello (8–3) || — || 32,033 || 31–24
|- bgcolor="ffbbbb"
| 56 || June 5 || Blue Jays || L 3–7 || Happ (5–2) || Verlander (6–5) || Janssen (10) || 39,440 || 31–25
|- bgcolor="#bbffbb"
| 57 || June 6 || Red Sox || W 6–2 || Smyly (3–4) || De La Rosa (1–1) || — || 39,762 || 32–25
|- bgcolor="#bbffbb"
| 58 || June 7 || Red Sox || W 8–6 || Scherzer (7–2) || Lester (6–7) || — || 43,359 || 33–25
|- bgcolor="ffbbbb"
| 59 || June 8 || Red Sox || L 3–5 || Lackey (7–4) || Chamberlain (1–3) || Uehara (12) || 33,835 || 33–26
|- bgcolor="ffbbbb"
| 60 || June 9 || @ White Sox || L 5–6 || Noesí (2–4) || Porcello (8–4) || Belisario (6) || 18,803 || 33–27
|- bgcolor="bbbbbb" 
| — || June 10 || @ White Sox ||colspan=6| Postponed (rain). Rescheduled to August 30.
|- bgcolor="ffbbbb"
| 61 || June 11 || @ White Sox || L 2–8 || Danks (5–5) || Verlander (6–6) || — || 18,424 || 33–28
|- bgcolor="#bbffbb"
| 62 || June 12 || @ White Sox || W 4–0 || Scherzer (8–2) || Sale (5–1) || — || 20,626 || 34–28
|- bgcolor="ffbbbb"
| 63 || June 13 || Twins || L 0–2 || Gibson (6–5) || Smyly (3–5) || Perkins (17) || 39,811 || 34–29
|- bgcolor="#bbffbb"
| 64 || June 14 || Twins || W 12–9 || Sánchez (3–2) || Deduno (2–5) || Krol (1) || 41,498 || 35–29
|- bgcolor="#bbffbb"
| 65 || June 15 || Twins || W 4–3 || Nathan (3–2) || Fien (3–3) || — || 41,462 || 36–29
|- bgcolor="ffbbbb"
| 66 || June 16 || Royals || L 8–11 || Vargas (7–2) || Verlander (6–7) || — || 31,774 || 36–30
|- bgcolor="ffbbbb"
| 67 || June 17 || Royals || L 4–11 || Ventura (5–5) || Scherzer (8–3) || — || 34,328 || 36–31
|- bgcolor="ffbbbb"
| 68 || June 18 || Royals || L 1–2 || Guthrie (4–6) || Smyly (3–6) || Holland (21) || 37,209 || 36–32
|- bgcolor="#bbffbb"
| 69 || June 19 || Royals || W 2–1 || Sánchez (4–2) || Duffy (4–6) || Nathan (14) || 35,715 || 37–32
|- bgcolor="#bbffbb"
| 70 || June 20 || @ Indians || W 6–4 || Porcello (9–4) || Kluber (6–5) || Nathan (15) || 33,545 || 38–32
|- bgcolor="#bbffbb"
| 71 || June 21 || @ Indians || W 5–4 (10) ||Nathan (4–2) || Allen (3–2) || Coke (1) || 40,712 || 39–32
|- bgcolor="#bbffbb"
| 72 || June 22 || @ Indians || W 10–4 || Scherzer (9–3) || Tomlin (4–5) || — || 26,023 || 40–32
|- bgcolor="#bbffbb"
| 73 || June 24 || @ Rangers || W 8–2 || Smyly (4–6) || Lewis (5–5) || — || 35,526 || 41–32
|- bgcolor="#bbffbb"
| 74 || June 25 || @ Rangers || W 8–6 || Sánchez (5–2) || Saunders (0–4) || Nathan (16) || 34,254 || 42–32
|- bgcolor="#bbffbb"
| 75 || June 26 || @ Rangers || W 6–0 || Porcello (10–4) || Martinez (1–5) || — || 34,989 || 43–32
|- bgcolor="ffbbbb"
| 76 || June 27 || @ Astros || L 3–4 (11) || Buchanan (1–1) || Hardy (0–1) || — || 22,386 || 43–33
|- bgcolor="#bbffbb"
| 77 || June 28 || @ Astros || W 4–3 || Coke (1–1) || Williams (1–4) || Nathan (17) || 25,788 || 44–33
|- bgcolor="ffbbbb"
| 78 || June 29 || @ Astros || L 4–6 || Feldman (4–4) || Smyly (4–7) || Sipp (1) || 22,478 || 44–34
|- bgcolor="#bbffbb"
| 79 || June 30 || Athletics || W 5–4 || Hardy (1–1) || Doolittle (1–3) || — || 42,477 || 45–34
|-

|- bgcolor="#bbffbb"
| 80 || July 1 || Athletics || W 3–0 || Porcello (11–4) || Mills (1–1) || — || 32,455 || 46–34
|- bgcolor="#bbffbb"
| 81 || July 2 || Athletics || W 9–3 || Verlander (7–7) || Chavez (6–5) || — || 35,445 || 47–34
|- bgcolor="#bbffbb"
| 82 || July 3 || Rays || W 8–1 || Scherzer (10–3) || Bédard (4–6) || — || 33,908 || 48–34
|- bgcolor="ffbbbb"
| 83 || July 4 || Rays || L 3–6 || Cobb (4–6) || Smyly (4–8) || McGee (4) || 40,657 || 48–35
|- bgcolor="ffbbbb"
| 84 || July 5 || Rays || L 2–7 || Archer (5–5) || Sánchez (5–3) || — || 38,087 || 48–36
|- bgcolor="ffbbbb"
| 85 || July 6 || Rays || L 3–7 || Price (8–7) || Porcello (11–5) || McGee (5) || 31,917 || 48–37
|- bgcolor="#bbffbb"
| 86 || July 8 || Dodgers || W 14–5 || Verlander (8–7) || Ryu (9–5) || — || 36,912 || 49–37
|- bgcolor="#bbffbb"
| 87 || July 9 || Dodgers || W 4–1 || Scherzer (11–3) || Greinke (11–5) || Nathan (18) || 36,462 || 50–37
|- bgcolor="#bbffbb"
| 88 || July 10 || @ Royals || W 16–4 || Smyly (5–8) || Guthrie (5–8) || — || 21,775 || 51–37
|- bgcolor="#bbffbb"
| 89 || July 11 || @ Royals || W 2–1 || Sánchez (6–3) || Duffy (5–9) || Nathan (19) || 31,581 || 52–37
|- bgcolor="#bbffbb"
| 90 || July 12 || @ Royals || W 5–1 || Porcello (12–5) || Shields (9–5) || — || 33,849 || 53–37
|- bgcolor="ffbbbb"
| 91 || July 13 || @ Royals || L 2–5 || Ventura (7–7) || Verlander (8–8) || Holland (25) || 23,424 || 53–38
|- bgcolor="ffbbbb"
| 92 || July 18 || Indians || L 3–9 || Bauer (4–4) || Sánchez (6–4) || — || 42,255 || 53–39
|- bgcolor="ffbbbb"
| 93 || July 19 || Indians || L 2–6 || Kluber (10–6) || VerHagen (0–1) || — || 38,109 || 53–40
|- bgcolor="ffbbbb"
| 94 || July 19 || Indians || L 2–5 || Carrasco (3–3) || Nathan (4–3) || Allen (13) || 42,044 || 53–41
|- bgcolor="#bbffbb"
| 95 || July 20 || Indians || W 5–1 || Smyly (6–8) || Tomlin (5–7) || — || 41,736 || 54–41
|- bgcolor="#bbffbb"
| 96 || July 21 || @ Diamondbacks || W 4–3 || Verlander (9–8) || Delgado (1–2) || Nathan (20) || 25,907 || 55–41
|- bgcolor="ffbbbb"
| 97 || July 22 || @ Diamondbacks || L 4–5 || De La Rosa (2–0) || Coke (1–2) || Reed (24) || 29,515 || 55–42
|- bgcolor="#bbffbb"
| 98 || July 23 || @ Diamondbacks || W 11–5 || Sánchez (7–4) || Cahill (1–7) || — || 24,174 || 56–42
|- bgcolor="#bbffbb"
| 99 || July 24 || @ Angels || W 6–4 || Scherzer (12–3) || Richards (11–3) || Nathan (21) || 40,146 || 57–42
|- bgcolor="ffbbbb"
| 100 || July 25 || @ Angels || L 1–2 || Morin (3–3) || Smyly (6–9) || Street (2) || 42,915 || 57–43
|- bgcolor="ffbbbb"
| 101 || July 26 || @ Angels || L 0–4 || Shoemaker (8–3) || Verlander (9–9) || — || 43,569 || 57–44
|- bgcolor="ffbbbb"
| 102 || July 27 || @ Angels || L 1–2 || Smith (4–0) || Chamberlain (1–4) || Street (3) || 36,252 || 57–45
|- bgcolor="ffbbbb"
| 103 || July 29 || White Sox || L 4–11 || Quintana (6–7) || Sánchez (7–5) || — || 40,032 || 57–46
|- bgcolor="#bbffbb"
| 104 || July 30 || White Sox || W 7–2 || Scherzer (13–3) || Noesí (5–8) || — || 37,193 || 58–46
|- bgcolor="ffbbbb"
| 105 || July 31 || White Sox || L 4–7 || Belisario (4–7) || Soria (1–4) || Petricka (6) || 41,306 || 58–47
|-

|- bgcolor="#bbffbb"
| 106 || August 1 || Rockies || W 4–2 || Verlander (10–9) || Morales (5–6) || Nathan (22) || 39,052 || 59–47
|- bgcolor="#bbffbb"
| 107 || August 2 || Rockies || W 11–5 || Porcello (13–5) || Matzek (2–6) || || 42,811 || 60–47
|- bgcolor="#bbffbb"
| 108 || August 3 || Rockies || W 4–0 || Sánchez (8–5) || de la Rosa (11–7) || — || 41,487 || 61–47
|- bgcolor="ffbbbb"
| 109 || August 4 || @ Yankees || L 1–2 || McCarthy (4–0) || Scherzer (13–4) || Robertson (30) || 41,603 || 61–48
|- bgcolor="#bbffbb"
| 110 || August 5 || @ Yankees || W 4–3 (12) || Soria (2–4) || Daley (0–1) || Nathan (23) || 40,078 || 62–48
|- bgcolor="ffbbbb"
| 111 || August 6 || @ Yankees || L 1–5 || Warren (2–5) || Verlander (10–10) || — || 40,067 || 62–49
|- bgcolor="ffbbbb"
| 112 || August 7 || @ Yankees || L 0–1 || Greene (3–1) || Porcello (13–6) || Robertson (31) || 47,013 || 62–50
|- bgcolor="#bbffbb"
| 113 || August 8 || @ Blue Jays || W 5–4 || Alburquerque (3–1) || Janssen (3–1) || Nathan (24) || 36,237 || 63–50
|- bgcolor="ffbbbb"
| 114 || August 9 || @ Blue Jays || L 2–3 (10) || Loup (4–3) || Chamberlain (1–5) || — || 45,927 || 63–51
|- bgcolor="ffbbbb"
| 115 || August 10 || @ Blue Jays || L 5–6 (19) || Jenkins (1–1) || Porcello (13–7) || — || 46,126 || 63–52
|- bgcolor="ffbbbb"
| 116 || August 11 || @ Pirates || L 6–11 || Locke (4–3) || Verlander (10–11) || — || 35,314 || 63–53
|- bgcolor="ffbbbb"
| 117 || August 12 || @ Pirates || L 2–4 || Volquez (10–7) || Ray (1–2) || Melancon (22) || 34,919 || 63–54
|- bgcolor="#bbffbb"
| 118 || August 13 || Pirates || W 8–4 || Hardy (2–1) || Worley (5–2) || — || 41,043 || 64–54
|- bgcolor="#bbffbb"
| 119 || August 14 || Pirates || W 5–2 || Scherzer (14–4) || Liriano (3–9) || — || 41,986 || 65–54
|- bgcolor="ffbbbb"
| 120 || August 15 || Mariners || L 2–7 || Paxton (3–0) || Porcello (13–8) || — || 42,385 || 65–55
|- bgcolor="#bbffbb"
| 121 || August 16 || Mariners || W 4–2 || Price (12–8) || Hernández (13–4) || Nathan (25) || 43,833 || 66–55
|- bgcolor="ffbbbb"
| 122 || August 17 || Mariners || L 1–8 || Young (12–6) || Ray (1–3) || — || 41,181 || 66–56
|- bgcolor="#bbffbb"
| 123 || August 19 || @ Rays || W 8–6 (11) || Johnson (5–2) || Balfour (1–5) || Nathan (26) || 14,331 || 67–56
|- bgcolor="#bbffbb"
| 124 || August 20 || @ Rays || W 6–0 || Porcello (14–8) || Odorizzi (9–10) || — || 13,575 || 68–56
|- bgcolor="ffbbbb"
| 125 || August 21 || @ Rays || L 0–1 || Cobb (9–6) || Price (12–9) || McGee (14) || 19,189 || 68–57
|- bgcolor="ffbbbb"
| 126 || August 22 || @ Twins || L 6–20 || Pressly (2–0) || Ray (1–4) || — || 29,394 || 68–58
|- bgcolor="ffbbbb"
| 127 || August 23 || @ Twins || L 4–12 || Pino (2–5) || Farmer (0–1) || — || 25,110 || 68–59
|- bgcolor="#bbffbb"
| 128 || August 23 || @ Twins || W 8–6 || Verlander (11–11) || May (0–3) || Nathan (27) || 25,578 || 69–59
|- bgcolor="#bbffbb"
| 129 || August 24 || @ Twins || W 13–4 || Scherzer (15–4) || Gibson (11–10) || — || 23,983 || 70–59
|- bgcolor="#bbffbb"
| 130 || August 26 || Yankees || W 5–2 || Porcello (15–8) || McCarthy (5–3) || Nathan (28) || 40,488 || 71–59
|- bgcolor="ffbbbb"
| 131 || August 27 || Yankees || L 4–8 || Greene (4–1) || Price (12–10) || — || 40,876 || 71–60
|- bgcolor="#bbffbb"
| 132 || August 28 || Yankees || W 3–2 || Coke (2–2) || Kelley (2–5) || — || 42,647 || 72–60
|- bgcolor="#bbffbb"
| 133 || August 29 || @ White Sox || W 7–1 || Verlander (12–11) || Carroll (5–9) || — || 17,071 || 73–60
|- bgcolor="ffbbbb"
| 134 || August 30 || @ White Sox || L 3–6 || Sale (11–3) || Scherzer (15–5) || Petricka (10) || 20,556 || 73–61
|- bgcolor="#bbffbb"
| 135 || August 30 || @ White Sox || W 8–4 || Ryan (1–0) || Bassitt (0–1) || — || 23,723 || 74–61
|- bgcolor="ffbbbb"
| 136 || August 31 || @ White Sox || L 2–6 || Quintana (7–10) || Porcello (15–9) || — || 26,336 || 74–62
|-

|- bgcolor="#bbffbb"
| 137 || September 1 || @ Indians || W 12–1 || Price (13–10) || Kluber (13–9) || — || 23,296 || 75–62
|- bgcolor="#bbffbb"
| 138 || September 2 || @ Indians || W 4–2 || Coke (3–2) || Allen (5–4) || Nathan (29) || 9,990 || 76–62
|- bgcolor="ffbbbb"
| 139 || September 3 || @ Indians || L 0–7 || Salazar (6–6) || Verlander (12–12) || — || 11,739 || 76–63
|- bgcolor="#bbffbb"
| 140 || September 4 || @ Indians || W 11–4 (11) || Coke (4–2) || Tomlin (6–9) || — || 11,935 || 77–63
|- bgcolor="ffbbbb"
| 141 || September 5 || Giants || L 2–8 || Peavy (4–4) || Porcello (15–10) || — || 31,940 || 77–64
|- bgcolor="ffbbbb"
| 142 || September 6 || Giants || L 4–5 || Bumgarner (17–9) || Price (13–11) || Casilla (15) || 35,722 || 77–65
|- bgcolor="#bbffbb"
| 143 || September 7 || Giants || W 6–1 || Lobstein (1–0) || Hudson (9–10) || — || 27,523 || 78–65
|- bgcolor="#bbffbb"
| 144 || September 8 || Royals || W 9–5 || Verlander (13–12) || Guthrie (10–11) || — || 30,758 || 79–65
|- bgcolor="#bbffbb"
| 145 || September 9 || Royals || W 4–2 || Scherzer (16–5) || Vargas (11–8) || Nathan (30) || 32,603 || 80–65
|- bgcolor="ffbbbb"
| 146 || September 10 || Royals || L 0–3 || Shields (14–7) || Porcello (15–11) || Davis (3) || 29,751 || 80–66
|- bgcolor="#bbffbb"
| 147 || September 12 || Indians || W 7–2 || Price (14–11) || Carrasco (7–5) || — || 38,341 || 81–66
|- bgcolor="#bbffbb"
| 148 || September 13 || Indians || W 5–4 || Chamberlain (2–5) || Shaw (5–4) || Nathan (31) || 41,190 || 82–66
|- bgcolor="#bbffbb"
| 149 || September 14 || Indians || W 6–4 || Coke (5–2) || Shaw (5–5) || Nathan (32) || 39,395 || 83–66
|- bgcolor="#bbffbb"
| 150 || September 15 || @ Twins || W 8–6 || Ryan (2–0) || Fien (5–6) || Soria (18) || 19,700 || 84–66
|- bgcolor="ffbbbb"
| 151 || September 16 || @ Twins || L 3–4 || Perkins (4–3) || Nathan (4–4) || — || 22,066 || 84–67
|- bgcolor="ffbbbb"
| 152 || September 17 || @ Twins || L 4–8 || Gibson (12–11) || Price (14–12) || — || 22,285 || 84–68
|- bgcolor="#bbffbb"
| 153 || September 19 || @ Royals || W 10–1 || Verlander (14–12) || Vargas (11–10) || — || 37,945 || 85–68
|- bgcolor="#bbffbb"
| 154 || September 20 || @ Royals || W 3–2 || Scherzer (17–5) || Shields (14–8) || Nathan (33) || 37,074 || 86–68
|- bgcolor="ffbbbb"
| 155 || September 21 || @ Royals || L 2–5 || Guthrie (12–11) || Porcello (15–12) || Holland (43) || 37,212 || 86–69
|- bgcolor="ffbbbb"
| 156 || September 22 || White Sox || L 0–2 || Bassitt (1–1) || Lobstein (1–1) || Petricka (14) || 30,758 || 86–70
|- bgcolor="#bbffbb"
| 157 || September 23 || White Sox || W 4–3 || Nathan (5–4) || Petricka (1–6) || — || 33,213 || 87–70
|- bgcolor="#bbffbb"
| 158 || September 24 || White Sox || W 6–1 || Verlander (15–12) || Guerra (2–4) || — || 36,810 || 88–70
|- bgcolor="#bbffbb"
| 159 || September 25 || Twins || W 4–2 || Scherzer (18–5) || May (3–6) || Nathan (34) || 33,077 || 89–70
|- bgcolor="ffbbbb"
| 160 || September 26 || Twins || L 4–11 || Achter (1–0) || Porcello (15–13) || — || 35,178 || 89–71
|- bgcolor="ffbbbb"
| 161 || September 27 || Twins || L 3–12 || Nolasco (6–12) || Lobstein (1–2) || — || 38,805 || 89–72
|- bgcolor="#bbffbb"
| 162 || September 28 || Twins || W 3–0 || Price (15–12) || Gibson (13–12) || Nathan (35) || 40,501 || 90–72
|-

Postseason

American League Division Series

|- bgcolor="ffbbbb"
| 1 || October 2  || @ Orioles || L 3–12 || Tillman (1–0) || Scherzer (0–1) || — || 47,842 || 0–1
|- bgcolor="ffbbbb"
| 2 || October 3  || @ Orioles || L 6–7 || Brach (1–0) || Soria (0–1) || Britton (1) || 48,058 || 0–2
|- bgcolor="ffbbbb"
| 3 || October 5  || Orioles || L 1–2 || Norris (1–0) || Price (0–1) || Britton (2) || 43,013 || 0–3 
|-

Detailed Records

Roster

Player stats

Batting

Note: G = Games played; AB = At bats; R = Runs scored; H = Hits; 2B = Doubles; 3B = Triples; HR = Home runs; RBI = Runs batted in; AVG = Batting average; SB = Stolen bases

+Totals with Tigers only.

Pitching

Starters
Note: W = Wins; L = Losses; ERA = Earned run average; G = Games pitched; GS = Games started; SV = Saves; IP = Innings pitched; R = Runs allowed; ER = Earned runs allowed; BB = Walks allowed; K = Strikeouts

+Totals with Tigers only.

Bullpen
Note: W = Wins; L = Losses; ERA = Earned run average; G = Games pitched; GS = Games started; SV = Saves; IP = Innings pitched; R = Runs allowed; ER = Earned runs allowed; BB = Walks allowed; K = Strikeouts

+Totals with Tigers only.

Farm system

References

External links

2014 Detroit Tigers at Baseball Reference
Detroit Tigers official site

Detroit Tigers seasons
Detroit Tigers
Detroit Tigers
American League Central champion seasons
2014 in Detroit